The men's 1500 metres at the 2016 European Athletics Championships took place at the Olympic Stadium on 7 and 9 July. The gold medal was won by Filip Ingebrigtsen from Norway while David Bustos from Spain won silver and Henrik Ingebrigtsen, older brother of Filip, won bronze medal.

Records

Schedule

Results

Round 1 

First 3 (Q) and next 3 fastest (q) qualify for the final.

Final

References

External links
 amsterdam2016.org, official championship site.

1500 M
1500 metres at the European Athletics Championships